Rugby union in Réunion is a minor but growing sport.

Governing body

The Comité Territorial de Rugby de la Réunion is a committee under the umbrella of the French Rugby Federation which is the governing body for rugby union within Réunion.

The committee is not affiliated to the IRB in its own right, but it is affiliated to Confederation of African Rugby (CAR), which is the regional governing body for Africa.

History
Rugby was first introduced to the Réunion by the French. Isolated in rugby terms, Réunion competes in the Africa Cup. More talented players tend to leave for Metropolitan France.

See also  
 Réunion national rugby union team
 Rugby union in France

References

External links
 CAR
 Archives du Rugby: Reunion

 
Sport in Réunion